Vladislav Andreyevich Davankov (born 25 February 1984, Smolensk) is a Russian political figure and a deputy of the 8th State Duma.

After graduating from the Moscow State University, Davankov started working at the Faberlic company that was founded by Alexey Nechayev. In 2013, Davankov became the Vice President of the company. In 2020, he was appointed the Head of the Central Executive Committee of the New People party. Since September 2021, he has served as deputy of the 8th State Duma. On October 12, 2021, he was appointed Deputy Chairman of the State Duma Vyacheslav Volodin.

References
 

 

1984 births
Living people
New People politicians
21st-century Russian politicians
Eighth convocation members of the State Duma (Russian Federation)
People from Smolensk